The following is a list of All-American Girls Professional Baseball League players who formed part of the circuit  during its twelve years of existence.

See also
 List of All-American Girls Professional Baseball League players (A–C)
 List of All-American Girls Professional Baseball League players (D–G)
 List of All-American Girls Professional Baseball League players (H–L)
 List of All-American Girls Professional Baseball League players (S–Z)

M
 
  * Maguire also played under her married name of Dorothy Chapman.

N

  1 Nesbitt also played under her married name of Mary Wisham.
  2 Nicol also played under her married name of Helen Fox.

O

P

  * Pérez also played under her married name of Migdalia Jinright.

R

  * Ruhnke also played under her married name of Irene Sanvitas.

References
 

M